The Sydney University Liberal Club (SULC) is a student association operating under the auspices of the University of Sydney Union (USU). The club hosts policy debates, annual dinners, student election campaigns, and guest speaker events with members of parliament. It is an affiliate of the Australian Liberal Students' Federation.

History

Founded in 1933, the Sydney University Liberal Club has a historical rivalry with the Melbourne University Liberal Club, which was established a few years earlier in 1925.

The Patron of the Sydney University Liberal Club is Former Prime Minister 1996–2007, John Howard. Whilst historically the Liberal Club claimed two state delegates within the Liberal Party, the club itself is no longer formally affiliated with the Party.

The club attracted attention for its early opposition to the White Australia policy. In 1958, it circulated a memorandum called "White Australia in a Changing World" at a Liberal Party Convention in Sydney, describing the policy as the "greatest stumbling block in our foreign policy that exists today."

A defining debate in the club over the past 30 years has been Voluntary Student Unionism (VSU). With the exception of a short period in the late 1990s, the Sydney University Liberal Club has been a consistent supporter of voluntary student unionism, and has attracted national media coverage in recent years for its pro-VSU counterprotests.

John Howard Debating Cup

In 2010 the club launched the annual John Howard Debating Cup with the purpose of celebrating the legacy of the Howard Government and providing a forum for public policy debate amongst Liberal Students. The Howard Cup is an intervarsity debating competition between six Liberal Clubs across New South Wales, consisting of preliminary rounds and a grand finals.

In 2011 over 250 attendees from Sydney University, Macquarie University, University of Technology Sydney, University of New South Wales, University of Western Sydney, and the University of Wollongong attended the competition.

Each year the grand finals features an adjudication and keynote address by John Howard, and adjudications by notable conservatives like Tony Abbott, Malcolm Turnbull, Janet Albrechtsen, Piers Akerman, Alexander Downer, Natasha Maclaren-Jones, Tom Switzer, and Paul Fletcher. The Cup was initiated by then Vice-President Alex Dore. Winning teams of the competition have been:
2010 – University of Wollongong Liberal Club
2011 – Sydney University Liberal Club
2012 – Sydney University Liberal Club
2013 – Sydney University Liberal Club
2015 – University of New South Wales Liberal Club

Controversy

In 2006 the Sydney Morning Herald reported that the club had become more conservative after a former member of the club proposed a resolution to reintroduce the death penalty for "heinous crimes", and to strip non-Christians of the Christmas and Easter holidays. This prompted allegations of 'strong conservatism', and claims that it risked the Liberal Party's reputation as "a broad church", even though these motions failed to pass or to attract any significant support.

In 2009, the club drew controversy in The Australian after a hostile takeover attempt by the "far-right" was quashed at an Annual General Meeting chaired by David Clarke MLC, and attended by Marie Ficarra MLC and Dominic Perrottet MP. An investigation by the Liberal Party ensued after allegations of threatening behaviour towards young members of the club; police were also called to the incident.

In May 2011, this same "far-right" group again drew controversy in the Sydney Morning Herald after the Vice-President and Secretary noticed the addition of over 60 international students to the club membership list just hours before a scheduled Ordinary Meeting. The Ordinary Meeting was subsequently disbanded by security, and a scheduled Annual General Meeting was postponed until September by the University of Sydney Union (USU). The stacking was instigated by then club President Adrian Pryke after his defection to the hard-right.

The club has also been a major contributor to the "Make Education Fair" campaign, headed by the Young Liberals. This campaign was created with the stated purpose of exposing and reducing political bias throughout all levels of education.  A Senate enquiry conducted to examine this potential bias saw many club members provide evidence.

In 2016 the club had a split in membership over a contentious upcoming SULC election between the President and Secretary. Amid concerns about vote-stacking, non-students registering to vote, and other issues, the University of Sydney dissolved the entire membership and required all members to re-apply in person.

On 23 September 2012, SULC hosted its annual President's Dinner with a keynote address by Sydney radio presenter Alan Jones.  In his address Mr Jones was cited as saying, "The old man recently died a few weeks ago of shame. To think that he had a daughter who told lies every time she stood for parliament" in reference to Prime Minister, Julia Gillard's recently deceased father. At the same event the Club auctioned off a jacket made of chaff bags, a reference to his previous comments on radio that Lord Mayor of Sydney, Clover Moore, Julia Gillard and Bob Brown should be "put into a chaff bag, thrown out to sea and made to swim back". These comments drew strong criticism from mass and social media commentators. Both the Liberal Club and Alan Jones issued an apology in relation to the matter.

Past Presidents

Notable alumni

 Malcolm Turnbull MP, 29th Prime Minister of Australia, 2015–2018, Minister of Communications 2013–2015, Leader of the Opposition 2008–2009
 John Howard AC, 25th Prime Minister of Australia 1996–2007 
 Joe Hockey MP, 38th Treasurer of Australia 2013–
 Mike Baird MP, 44th Premier of New South Wales, 2014–2017
 John Brogden, Leader of the NSW Opposition 2002–2005 
 Kerry Chikarovski, Leader of the NSW Opposition 1998–2002 
 Neville Wran, Premier of NSW, 1976–1986 
 Tony Abbott MP, 28th Prime Minister of Australia, 2013 – 2015- 
 Ted McWhinney, Member for Vancouver Quadra (Canada) 1993–2000 
 Paul Fletcher MP, Member for Bradfield
 Angus Taylor MP, Member for Hume, 2013–
 Alex Hawke MP, Member for Mitchell
 Mitch Fifield, Australian Senator
 Dominic Perrottet MP, Premier of New South Wales, Member for Castle Hill
 Don Harwin MLC, President of the NSW Legislative Council
 Peter Phelps Member of the NSW Legislative Council, 2011-2019
 Natasha Maclaren-Jones MLC, Member of NSW Legislative Council
 Marie Ficarra MLC, Member of NSW Legislative Council
 Jim Carlton AO, Minister for Health, 1982–1983
 Don Hayward, Victorian Minister for Education 1992–96

See also

Australian Liberal Students' Federation
Adelaide University Liberal Club
University of Tasmania Liberal Club

References

External links
Sydney University Liberal Club website
ALSF homepage
SULC at USU

Student politics in Australia
University of Sydney
1933 establishments in Australia
Student organisations in Australia
Student organizations established in 1933
Student political organizations
Organisations based in Sydney